Ana Ambrazienė (born April 14, 1955) is a retired hurdler from Lithuania. Also known as Anna Kostecka (or Kastetskaya), she was born in Vilnius and is of Polish descent. She represented the Soviet Union in the 1970s and 1980s.

Her personal best in the women's 400 m hurdles was 54.02 at a meet in Moscow on June 11, 1983. That mark was the standing world record for over a year.

Competition results

See also
 Women's 400 metres hurdles world record progression

References

External links

1955 births
Living people
Sportspeople from Vilnius
Lithuanian female hurdlers
Soviet female hurdlers
World Athletics Championships athletes for the Soviet Union
World Athletics Championships medalists
World record setters in athletics (track and field)
Lithuanian Sportsperson of the Year winners
Soviet people of Polish descent
Lithuanian people of Polish descent
Universiade medalists in athletics (track and field)
Universiade gold medalists for the Soviet Union
Medalists at the 1981 Summer Universiade